Ah Pak (meaning "uncle" or "old man") was the chieftain of the Cantonese pirates who defeated Portuguese pirates in Ningpo, Zhenjiang. The authorities at Ningpo were weak and requested his aid rather than submit to the tyranny of the Portuguese. His pirates caused the massacre against the Portuguese pirates. This incident was recorded in history as The Ningpo Massacre.

References

Year of birth missing
Year of death missing
Chinese pirates
People from Guangdong
Ningbo